Stadium Bogovinje is a multi-purpose stadium in the village Bogovinje near Tetovo, North Macedonia. It is used mostly for football matches and is currently the home stadium of FK Drita. The stadium holds 2,500 people.

References

Football venues in North Macedonia
Bogovinje Municipality